Sheila May Girling, Lady Caro (1 July 1924 – 14 February 2015) was a British artist, and wife of the sculptor Sir Anthony Caro.

Girling was born in Birmingham and studied at the Royal Academy. Her first solo exhibitions were in Canada but she also exhibited widely in Britain and the United States.

Biography
Sheila May Girling was born in Erdington, Birmingham on 1 July 1924. Her father, Cyril Stanley Frank Girling, was an engineer working for Dunlop Tyre Company and her mother was Beatrice May (née Harvey). Many of her family members had been painters, including her paternal grandfather, uncle and aunt. Her grandfather was also an art dealer in London, who allegedly would deal in fakes and create forgeries at his studio.

Girling was educated at the Birmingham School of Art and from 1947 trained at Royal Academy Schools, London. On 17 December 1947, she married Sir Anthony Caro, whom she had met as a university art student. They had two sons together: Timothy a zoologist; and Paul, a painter. 

She paused her art career to focus on raising them, however she would offer advice and criticism to her husband on his works. When she returned to the art world in the 1970s, she decided to focus on Abstract art. Girling died of heart disease, at her home in Frongnal, on 14 February 2015, aged 90.

Exhibitions
Girling held a few exhibitions of her works in America during the 1980s, as well as joining some group shows. By the end of the 1980s, she was exhibiting in the Graham Dixon and Annely Juda galleries in London. After her death in 2015, a retrospective of her work was held in the Annely Juda Gallery.

References

1924 births
2015 deaths
Artists from Birmingham, West Midlands
British women artists
Wives of knights